Fighting for Space: Two Pilots and Their Historic Battle for Female Spaceflight is a nonfiction book by Amy Shira Teitel published in 2020.

Summary
Fighting for Space presents the intertwined biographies of two pilots, Jacqueline Cochran and Jerrie Cobb, and their competing visions of women in the space program.

Reception
In The Space Review, Jeff Foust says "Teitel certainly brings to life these two pioneering women who had similar visions, but conflicting views of how to realize them." Foust takes issue with the lack of footnotes and Teitel's reluctance to address inconsistencies between claims made by the women and historical evidence. 

Ethan Siegel, astrophysicist and science writer, says the book is "incredibly well-researched" and "what's perhaps most breathtaking about the book is the sheer number of long-buried letters and correspondences that Teitel has unearthed and reproduced in full."

The Library Journal describes it as an "inspiring story" and an "awe-inducing biography that space junkies, feminists, and historians will eat up." Fighting for Space was a Library Journal Top Pick in women's history. Kirkus Reviews described it as a "well-researched contribution to women's and aviation history."

References

External links
Interview with CBC Radio
C-Span interview (video)

2020 non-fiction books
Mercury 13
Grand Central Publishing books